Padar is a village and municipality in the Oghuz Rayon of Azerbaijan.  It has a population of 2,224.

References 

Populated places in Oghuz District